The list of ship launches in 1746 includes a chronological list of some ships launched in 1746.


References

1746
Ship launches